Valea Salciei is a commune in Buzău County, Muntenia, Romania. It is composed of three villages: Modreni, Valea Salciei and Valea Salciei-Cătun.

References

Communes in Buzău County
Localities in Muntenia